The 1999–2000 League of Ireland First Division season was the 15th season of the League of Ireland First Division.

Overview
The First Division was contested by 10 teams and Bray Wanderers A.F.C. won the division.

Final table

Promotion/relegation play-off
Third placed Kilkenny City played off against Waterford United who finished in tenth place in the 1999–2000 League of Ireland Premier Division. The winner would compete in the 2000–01 League of Ireland Premier Division.

1st Leg

2nd Leg 

Kilkenny City won 2–0 on aggregate and were promoted to the Premier Division.

See also
 1999–2000 League of Ireland Premier Division

References

League of Ireland First Division seasons
2
Ireland